The 2006 Arab Junior Athletics Championships was the 12th edition of the international athletics competition for under-20 athletes from Arab countries. It took place in Cairo, Egypt. A total of 44 athletics events were contested, 22 for men and 22 for women.

Medal summary

Men

Women

Medal table

References

Results
Arab junior championships, Cairo (Egypt) 1-4/11. AfricaAthle (archived). Retrieved on 2016-07-08.

Arab Junior Athletics Championships
International athletics competitions hosted by Egypt
Sports competitions in Cairo
Arab Junior Athletics Championships
Arab Junior Athletics Championships
2006 in youth sport
Athletics in Cairo